Kreil is a German language  surname. Notable people with the name include:
 Karl Kreil (1798–1862), Austrian meteorologist and astronomer
 Nicole Kreil (born 1965), Austrian diver
 Tanja Kreil (born 1977), German electrician

German-language surnames
Occupational surnames